USPC may refer to:

 The United States Poker Championship
 United States Pony Clubs
 United States Playing Card Company (USPC)
 Heckler & Koch USP Compact Variant (USPc)
 United States Parole Commission
 Peace Corps, also known as the United States Peace Corps (USPC)
 Urban Sports Performance Centre